Le Bourget is a station on the line B of the Réseau Express Régional, a hybrid suburban commuter and rapid transit line. The station is also served by Paris Tramway Line 11. The station will be where the Paris Metro Line 16 and Paris Metro Line 17 divide, with Line 16 heading to Noisy-Champs and Line 17 going to Le Mesnil-Amelot. It is named after the town of Le Bourget where the station is located, a northern suburb of Paris, in the Seine-Saint-Denis department of France.

History 
Le Bourget station was the primary point of deportation for French Jews during the Holocaust. Between 27 March 1942 and 23 June 1943, 42 trains carrying 40,450 Jews left Le Bourget for Auschwitz concentration camp and other extermination camps in Poland. Most had been imprisoned in the nearby Drancy internment camp.

References

External links

 

Railway stations in France opened in 1863
Railway stations in Seine-Saint-Denis
Réseau Express Régional stations
Paris Métro line 16